Isa Tara Guha (born 21 May 1985) is an English cricket commentator, television and radio cricket broadcaster, and a former England cricketer who played in the 2005 World Cup and the 2009 World Cup. She cites winning the World Cup in 2009 as a career highlight. She played as a right-arm fast-medium bowler and right-handed batter. She appeared in 8 Test matches, 83 One Day Internationals and 22 Twenty20 Internationals for England between 2001 and 2011. She played domestic cricket for Thames Valley and Berkshire.

Early years and education
Guha's parents came to the UK in the 1970s from Calcutta, West Bengal, India She was born in High Wycombe, England.

Guha started playing cricket with her older brother when she was about eight, and was selected for the Development England side at 13.

She went to Wycombe High School, a state school for girls. She graduated with a degree in biochemistry and molecular biology and gained an MPhil in neuroscience, both at University College London.

Cricket career
A right arm fast-medium bowler, Guha made her Test debut at 17 against India during their tour in 2002. As part of the same tour, Guha played in the 2002 Women's Tri-Series, and performed well, taking three wickets in England's loss against New Zealand in the final. She was the first woman of Indian heritage to play for England.

In 2002, Guha was named BBC Asian Network Sports Personality of the Year. Her best bowling in 44 One-Day Internationals is the 5 for 14 she took against the West Indies in 2008. As of 31 December 2008, she was ranked the number one bowler in the ICC Women's One Day International rankings. She took a career best 5 for 40 in her seventh Test match, against Australia at the Bradman Oval in Bowral in February 2008 and took nine wickets in the match, winning the player of the match award as England retained the Ashes. She was part of the England team which won the 2009 World Cup. She announced her retirement from international cricket on 9 March 2012, although she said she would continue to play county cricket for Berkshire.

Guha, along with Lynsey Askew, shares the world record partnership for the ninth wicket – 73 runs – in Women's ODI history.

Media work
Guha writes a column for the BBC Sport website and is a Test Match Special commentator. She joined ITV Sport in April 2012 as a co-presenter of ITV4's coverage of the Indian Premier League.

In 2016, Guha was a member of the inaugural Triple M radio Test cricket commentary team in Australia. In 2018, she was a commentator for Sky Sports for the England/Pakistan Test matches, and was named as a commentator for Fox Cricket for their Australian cricket coverage. She was also a member of the commentary team at the 2019 Cricket World Cup. In 2020 she was the lead presenter of a new BBC TV Test and ODI highlights show.

Charity interests
Isa Guha is an Ambassador (or "Supporter") for Sporting Equals and the British Asian Trust.

Personal life
Guha married her long-time boyfriend, musician Richard Thomas who is a member of the band Brother and Bones, in September 2018.

References

External links

1985 births
Living people
British sportspeople of Indian descent
British Asian cricketers
English people of Indian descent
English people of Bengali descent
Sportspeople from High Wycombe
England women Test cricketers
England women One Day International cricketers
England women Twenty20 International cricketers
Berkshire women cricketers
Thames Valley women cricketers
Women cricket commentators
English cricket commentators